Charles German Hooper (16 April 1911 – 22 March 1995) was  Archdeacon of Ipswich from 1963 until 1976.

Hooper was educated at  Lincoln College, Oxford; and  ordained in 1935. His first post  was a  curacy at  Corsham. After that he served at Claremont, Cape Town and then as a wartime chaplain with the RAFVR. He held incumbencies at Castle Combe, Sandy, Bishop's Stortford, Bildeston and Ipswich.

References

1911 births
20th-century English Anglican priests
Alumni of Lincoln College, Oxford
Archdeacons of Ipswich
Royal Air Force chaplains
1995 deaths
Royal Air Force Volunteer Reserve personnel of World War II
World War II chaplains